Idilevo is a village in the municipality of Sevlievo, in Gabrovo Province, in northern central Bulgaria.

The current mayor of the village (re-elected 2016) is Hristo Peev

Idilevo is the home of the Motocamp which specializes in providing accommodation and assistance to motorcycle travelers.

References

Villages in Gabrovo Province